CHOT-DT, virtual channel 40 (UHF digital channel 32), branded on-air as TVA Gatineau–Ottawa, is a TVA-affiliated television station licensed to Gatineau, Quebec, Canada, which also serves Franco-Ontarians in the neighbouring capital city of Ottawa, Ontario. The station is owned by RNC Media, as part of a twinstick with Noovo affiliate CFGS-DT (channel 34). The two stations share studios on Rue Jean Proulx and Rue Buteau in the former city of Hull; CHOT-DT's transmitter is located at Camp Fortune in Chelsea, Quebec. This station can also be seen on Vidéotron channel 4 and in high definition channel 604 in Gatineau, and on Rogers Cable on channel 10 and digital channel 610 and in high definition on digital channel 611 in Ottawa.

CHOT-DT is the largest TVA station that is not owned-and-operated by the network. It is also the largest major network affiliate in Canada in a media market that is not owned by its associated network.

History
From 1974 to 1977, the Ottawa–Hull area received TVA programming from CFVO-TV (channel 30), which was the first French-language commercial station in the National Capital Region. CFVO was cooperatively owned and constantly struggled financially. After its March 1977 closure, Radio-Québec bought the channel 30 physical plant directly from CFVO's creditors. The Canadian Radio-television and Telecommunications Commission (CRTC) then invited bids for a new French-language commercial station to be affiliated with TVA and operate on channel 40. Though as many as four bids were rumoured to be incoming for the TVA affiliate, the CRTC only received two, from Télé-Métropole (owner of TVA flagship station CFTM in Montreal) and Radio-Nord. The CRTC selected the application from Radio-Nord in December; CHOT, known as "Télé-Outaouais", began operations on October 27, 1978. Pierre Thibault, who had been a temporary manager for CFVO late in the station's life, served as its first general manager.

For a time until the late 1990s, CHOT was branded as CHOT 40, referring to the station's channel number over the air. CHOT was one of the last television stations in Canada to use its over-the-air channel number in station branding. It is currently branded as TVA Gatineau–Ottawa.

Cable distribution
The station is carried on channel 4 by Vidéotron in Gatineau and on channel 10 by Rogers Cable in Ottawa.

CHOT is also carried by most of EastLink's cable systems in Northeastern Ontario, one of the only regions in English Canada that carries an affiliate station instead of the national feed of CFTM-DT. It has been available on cable in this region since the early 1980s, long before TVA carriage was mandated nationwide. Predecessor companies Northern Cable and Persona picked up CHOT due to the area's large Franco-Ontarian population, and continued to carry CHOT rather than switching providers.

News operation

TVA Nouvelles broadcasts a 30-minute local newscast every weekday at 6:00 pm, and, as of 2019, a 17-minute local newscast at 12:13 pm. In the past, CHOT had local news on weekends and a 15-minute noon newscast on weekdays, but recent cuts made by RNC Media had these newscasts replaced with Montreal-based TVA network news programs.

Digital television and high definition
After the analog television shutdown and digital conversion, which took place on August 31, 2011, CHOT-TV flashcut to digital maintaining operations on UHF channel 40. As part of the UHF spectrum repack, CHOT-DT was required to move broadcast frequencies by July 2020. CHOT-DT moved to UHF Channel 32 in July 2020; through the use of PSIP, CHOT-DT was to display as 40.1, but displays as 32.1.

References

External links
TVA Gatineau–Ottawa 

HOT
HOT
Television channels and stations established in 1978
HOT
1978 establishments in Quebec